Kabaddi was contested by seven teams at the 2007 Asian Indoor Games in Macau, China from 30 October to 3 November. The competition took place at Luso-Chinesa School Pavilion.

India won the gold medal after beating Pakistan in the final 35–17.

Medalists

Results

Preliminary

Gold medal match

References
Macau Indoor Games Official Website

2007 Asian Indoor Games events
2007
Asian